Stirling Energy Systems was a Scottsdale, Arizona-based company which developed equipment for utility-scale renewable energy power plants and distributed electrical generating systems using parabolic dish and stirling engine technology, touted as the highest efficiency solar technology.

In April 2008, Ireland-based NTR purchased a majority stake in Stirling Energy Systems for $100M. As of 8/3/2011 NTR reported they were seeking 3rd party investment in Stirling Energy Systems.

On 29 September 2011 Stirling Energy Systems filed for Chapter 7 bankruptcy, due to falling PV prices caused by subsidized Chinese Photo Voltaic.

In April 2012 the Maricopa Solar plant in Phoenix, Arizona was bought by United Sun Systems (Now TEXEL Energy Storage) in a joint venture with a Chinese/American corporation.

Overview 

According to their website, Stirling Energy Systems (SES) was a systems integration and project management company that is developing equipment for utility-scale renewable energy power plants and distributed electric generating systems ("gensets"). SES is teamed with Kockums Submarine Systems, NASA-Glenn Research Center, the U.S. Department of Energy (DOE), and The Boeing Company for solar power plants. SES claimed it was positioned to become a premier worldwide renewable energy technology company to meet the global demand for renewable electric generating technologies through the commercialization of its own stirling cycle engine technology for solar power generation applications.

Bankruptcy
On 29 September 2011, Stirling Energy Systems filed for Chapter 7 bankruptcy as the Stirling dish technology could not compete against the falling costs of solar photovoltaics, according to media reports. The falling photovoltaic prices were caused by Chinese subsidies.

In April 2012 the Maricopa Solar plant in Phoenix, Arizona was bought by a European formation based in London called United Sun Systems.

At the beginning of 2011 Stirling Energy's development arm, Tessera Solar, sold off its two large projects, the 709 MW Imperial Valley Solar Project and the 850 MW Calico Solar Energy Project to AES Solar and K.Road, respectively.

See also
Solar power plants in the Mojave Desert

References

External links

November 15, 2005 in Wired News -Stirling Systems signed contracts with Con Ed to build plants in the Mojave.
May 2005 in Fortune Magazine - Stirling Energy Systems makes Fortune Magazine’s 25 BREAKOUT COMPANIES 2005.
Feb 2005 in Popular Science Magazine - Dishing Out Real Power - Costs are down, interest is up, and the Stirling solar system is ready to flick the switch.
Jan 2005 in US News - It has been said that solar energy is the future of energy and always will be. But growing concern about climate change and high oil prices is generating new interest in ways to more efficiently capture the power of the sun.
Irish Times NTR posts record-breaking losses of €381m

Defunct technology companies of the United States
Companies based in Phoenix, Arizona
Renewable energy technology companies
Solar thermal energy
Stirling engines